Vitebsk is a rural locality (a khutor) and the administrative center of Vitebskoye Rural Settlement, Podgorensky District, Voronezh Oblast, Russia. The population was 215 as of 2010. There are 6 streets.

Geography 
Vitebsk is located 32 km east of Podgorensky (the district's administrative centre) by road. Saprino is the nearest rural locality.

References 

Rural localities in Podgorensky District